José Luis Caldero López was a career policeman and appointed Superintendent of the Puerto Rico Police from 2014 to 2017, in the former Governor Alejandro Garcia Padilla Administration  Caldero has 35 years of active service in the Puerto Rico Police Department and helped develop the law enforcement policy of the Popular Democratic Party 2012 platform. In 2018 José Caldero was named commissioner of the San Juan Police Department by the mayor of San Juan, Puerto Rico Hon.Carmen Yulin Cruz.

Education
Caldero López holds a Bachelor's degree in Criminal Justice.  He completed his master's degree in public affairs at the University of Turabo. In addition, he is a graduate of the National Academy and the school of hostage negotiators at the FBI Academy in Quantico, Virginia. Also, he holds a degree from the Academy of secret service security to dignitaries in Washington, DC.

Notes

References

Living people
People from Corozal, Puerto Rico
Superintendents of the Puerto Rico Police
Puerto Rican law enforcement personnel
Puerto Rican police officers
Year of birth missing (living people)